Solanum opacum is a species of flowering plant in the family Solanaceae. It is referred to by the common names green berry nightshade, or morelle verte and is a sprawling annual native to eastern Australia. It is part of the black nightshade group of Solanum species.

Description
A sprawling annual herb, minutely hairy, and with no prickles. The leaves are ovate to lanceolate, 3–6 cm long and 1–2 cm wide, usually with shallowly lobed margins. Both leaf surfaces are green and sparsely hairy. The petiole is 1–4 cm long. Inflorescences 2–5-flowered with a white stellate corolla 8–12 mm diameter. The berry is 8–10 mm diam., and green when mature.

Plant chemistry
An unidentified alkaloidal aglycone (0.4%) has been detected in the fruits of S.opacum, but none in the leaves or stems.

Food
Uncommonly cultivated as a "rare" fruit. The ripe berries are eaten when yellowish green, and the flavor is described as spicy-sweet.

References

opacum
Taxa named by Alexander Braun